Leikhamton is a 2014 Indian Meitei language film directed by Tej Kshetri and produced by Th. Leishang. It stars Maya Choudhury as the titular protagonist with Gokul Athokpam and Sushmita Mangsatabam in the lead roles. The story and screenplay of the film was written by Ksh. Subadani. Poirei Thokchom composed the soundtrack and Ksh. Subadani and Tej Kshetri wrote the lyrics.

Leikhamton was released at Bhagyachandra Open Air Theatre (BOAT), Imphal on 6 October 2014.

About
The film is about a widow Leikham (Maya Choudhury) who bravely faces the hurdles of life by driving a van for her livelihood. The film depicts the consequences met after Leikham's son got married and also narrates how her husband died. Gokul Athokpam plays double role in the film.

Cast
 Gokul Athokpam as Ibohal and Ningthem
 Maya Choudhury as Leikham
 Sushmita Mangsatabam as Dr. Ningthibee
 Nandakumar Nongmaithem
 Narmada Sougaijam as Leihao
 Irom Shyamkishore as Ningthibee's father
 Heisnam Ongbi Indu as R.K. Ongbi Ibemhal
 Longjam Ongbi Lalitabi as Tharikleima
 Hijam Shyamdhani as Rajkumar Sanajaoba
 Philem Puneshori
 Thokchom Joshep as Mera
 Jasmine Elangbam
 Pilot
 Ningthouja Jayvidya
 Tej Kshetri
 Ratan Lai

Soundtrack
Poirei Thokchom composed the soundtrack for the film and Ksh. Subadani and Tej Kshetri wrote the lyrics. The songs are titled Thajasu Thokli Leirangsu Satli, Thamoigi Mihulse and Numidang Waigina Tanjani.

References

2010s Meitei-language films
2014 films